Tiretta Bazaar, is a neighborhood near Lalbazar in Central Kolkata. It is usually called Old China Market. The locality was once home to 20,000 ethnic Chinese Indian nationals, but now the population has dropped to approximately 2,000. Most of the Hakka Chinese people in the area moved closer to Tangra. The traditional occupation of the Chinese Indian community in Kolkata had been working in the nearby tanning industry as well as in Chinese restaurants. The area is still noted for the Chinese restaurants where many people flock to taste traditional Chinese and Indian Chinese cuisine.

History

The bazaar is named after Edward Tiretta, an Italian immigrant from Venice, who was a land surveyor and owner in the area during late 18th-century.

During the time of Warren Hastings, the first governor-general of British India, a businessman by the name of Tong Achi established a sugar mill, along with a sugar plantation at Achipur,  from Calcutta, on the bank of the Hooghly River near the town of Budge Budge. A temple and the grave of Tong Achi still remain and are visited by many Chinese Indians, who arrive from the city to celebrate Chinese New Year.

One of the earliest records of immigration to India from China can be found in a short treatise from 1820.  This records hints that the first wave of immigration was of Hakkas but does not elaborate on the professions of these immigrants. According to a later police census, there were 362 Chinese in Calcutta in 1837. A common meeting place was the Temple of Lord Guan, the Martial God of Loyalty & Righteousness, located in the Chinese quarter near Dharmatolla. A certain C. Alabaster mentions in 1849 that Cantonese carpenters congregated in the Bow Bazar Street area. As late as 2006, Bow Bazar is still noted for carpentry, but few of the workers or owners are now Indians of Chinese origin.

According to Alabaster, there were lard manufacturers and shoemakers in addition to carpenters.  Running tanneries and working with leather were traditionally not considered "respectable" professions among upper-caste Hindus, and work was relegated to the so-called "lower caste" muchis and chamars.  Nevertheless, there was a significant demand, for high quality leather goods in colonial India, which Chinese Indians were able to fulfill. Alabaster also mentions "licensed" opium dens, run by "native Chinese" and a "Cheena Bazaar", where "contraband" was readily available.  Opium, however, was not illegal until after India's Independence from Great Britain in 1947. Immigration continued freely through the turn of the century and during World War I partly due to political upheavals in China, including the First and Second Opium Wars, the First Sino-Japanese War and the Yihetuan Movement.  Around the time of the First World War, the first Chinese-owned tanneries sprang up.

Transport

Road
Chittaranjan Avenue (C.R. Avenue) and Rabindra Sarani pass through the area from north to south. Bepin Behari Ganguly Street (B.B. Ganguly Street) and Kshirode Vidyavinode Avenue (New CIT Road) pass through the area from east to west. Many bus routes follow these roads.

Train
Sealdah Station and B.B.D Bag railway station are the nearest railway stations of Tiretta Bazaar.

Gallery

See also
Chinese temples in Kolkata
Chinese of Calcutta
Tangra, Calcutta
Indian Chinese cuisine

Notes

External links

Kolkata ChinaTown
Photos of Chinese New Year, Calcutta
Photos of Chinese Temple, Tiretta Bazar, Calcutta
Trade changes Indo-Chinese relations - BBC.co.uk
Kolkata's Vanishing Chinatown

Chinese-Indian culture
Ethnic enclaves in India
Neighbourhoods in Kolkata
Kolkata
Restaurant districts and streets in India
India–Italy relations